Quebec City was an electoral district of the Legislative Assembly of the Parliament of the Province of Canada, in Canada East.  It was created in 1841 and included much of Quebec City.  Its boundaries were specifically drawn by the British Governor General, Lord Sydenham, to include voters of British background, disenfranchising francophone Canadien voters, an example of an ethnic and linguistic gerrymander.  Sydenham's purpose was to gain support in the Legislative Assembly for the new Province of Canada, which had merged the formerly separate provinces of Lower Canada and Upper Canada, as well as his government.

Quebec City was represented by two members in the Legislative Assembly.  It was altered in the redistribution of 1853, and abolished in 1867, upon the creation of Canada and the province of Quebec.

Boundaries 

Quebec City electoral district covered much of the municipality of Quebec City, one of the largest centres in Canada East. However, portions of the municipality were carefully excised from the electoral district of Quebec City and added to the surrounding Quebec County, in furtherance of the Governor General's plan to increase the voting strength of British voters who would support his government. 

The Union Act, 1840 merged the two provinces of Upper Canada and Lower Canada into the Province of Canada, with a single Parliament.  The separate parliaments of Lower Canada and Upper Canada were abolished.Union Act, 1840, 3 & 4 Vict., c. 35, s. 2.  The Union Act provided that the pre-existing electoral boundaries of Lower Canada and Upper Canada would continue to be used in the new Parliament, unless altered by the Union Act itself.

Quebec City was one of the electoral districts specifically defined by the Union Act.  In the Legislative Assembly of Lower Canada, the municipality of Quebec had been included in the surrounding Quebec County, but had not been part of the County for voting purposes.  The municipality of Quebec had been divided into two electoral districts, called Quebec Upper Town and Quebec Lower Town, which elected their members separately from Quebec County.

The Union Act changed this situation by providing that the city and town of Quebec would be one district, represented by two members.   The Union Act gave the Governor General the power to set the boundaries for the district.  Any parts of the city which were not included in the boundaries set by the Governor General would be included in the adjoining electoral district.

The first Governor General, Lord Sydenham, exercised the power to draw boundaries by a proclamation issued shortly after the formation of the Province of Canada in early 1841.  His overall goal in drawing the boundaries was to ensure that supporters of the creation of the new Province of Canada and of his government would be elected. The boundaries did not follow the normal municipal boundaries, rather being drawn along certain streets and geographic features.  This new electoral district was designed to exclude as many francophone Canadien voters as possible, and to include as many voters of British background as possible, since they generally supported the union and Lord Sydenham's government. It was an example of an ethnic and linguistic gerrymander.  The areas of the municipality of Quebec which were not included in the new electoral district of Quebec City instead were included in Quebec County.  The result was the effective disenfranchisement of Quebec francophone voters in the 1841 election.

Members of the Legislative Assembly 

Quebec City was represented by two members in the Legislative Assembly. The following were the members for Quebec City.

Notes

Significant elections 

In 1841, in the first general election in the new Province of Canada, the Governor General intervened heavily in the voting in individual ridings, to ensure he had a majority in the Legislative Assembly.  In Quebec City, this intervention took the form of pressure on government officials and pensioners to vote for Sydenham's preferred candidates. Of the hundred and forty-eight voters in this group, one hundred and forty-five voted for Sydenham's candidates.

Abolition 

The district was abolished on July 1, 1867, when the British North America Act, 1867 came into force, creating Canada and splitting the Province of Canada into Quebec and Ontario.  It was succeeded by electoral districts of the same name in the House of Commons of Canada and the Legislative Assembly of Quebec.

References 

Electoral districts of Canada East